Daniel Krnćević (14 February 1929 – 15 February 1983) was a Croatian rower. He competed in the men's coxed four event at the 1948 Summer Olympics.

References

1929 births
1983 deaths
Croatian male rowers
Olympic rowers of Croatia
Rowers at the 1948 Summer Olympics
Sportspeople from Šibenik